Mitchell or Mitchel is an English and Scottish surname with two etymological origins. In some cases the name is derived from the Middle English and Old French (and Norman French) name , a vernacular form of the name Michael. The personal name Michael is ultimately derived from a Hebrew name, meaning "Who is like God". In some cases, the surname Mitchell was adopted as an equivalent of Mulvihill; this English-language surname is derived from the Irish-language , meaning "descendant of the devotee of St. Michael".

Geographical distribution
As of 2014, 65.5% of all bearers of the surname Mitchell were residents of the United States (frequency 1:759), 12.0% of England (1:639), 5.6% of Australia (1:581), 5.1% of Canada (1:987), 2.8% of Scotland (1:261), 2.4% of South Africa (1:3,154) and 1.3% of Jamaica (1:309).

In Scotland, the frequency of the surname was higher than average (1:261) in the following council areas:

 1. Angus (1:159)
 2. Dundee (1:161)
 3. Aberdeenshire (1:167)
 4. Clackmannanshire (1:181)
 5. Inverclyde (1:182)
 6. Moray (1:189)
 7. Fife (1:207)
 8. Aberdeen (1:210)
 9. Perth and Kinross (1:217)
 10. East Ayrshire (1:226)
 11. Midlothian (1:240)
 12. Scottish Borders (1:241)
 13. East Ayrshire (1:242)
 14. Falkirk (1:248)
 15. North Ayrshire (1:258) 

In the United States, the frequency of the surname was higher than average (1:759) in the following states:

 1. Alabama (1:360)
 2. Mississippi (1:388)
 3. Louisiana (1:455)
 4. Arkansas (1:460)
 5. Georgia (1:501)
 6. Tennessee (1:514)
 7. Delaware (1:528)
 8. North Carolina (1:534)
 9. Oklahoma (1:541)
 10. South Carolina (1:550)
 11. Maine (1:562)
 12. Virginia (1:576)
 13. Kentucky (1:606)
 14. Missouri (1:635)
 15. Utah (1:670)
 16. Maryland (1:680)
 17. Texas (1:680)
 18. Kansas (1:688)
 19. West Virginia (1:728)
 20. Idaho (1:734)
 21. Indiana (1:739)
 22. Michigan (1:743)
 23. Alaska (1:758)

People

A–E
Akil Mitchell, American basketball player
Alan Mitchell (botanist) (1922–1995), British dendrologist and forester
Alexander Mitchell (disambiguation), multiple people
Alvin Mitchell (disambiguation), multiple people
Andrea Mitchell, American TV journalist
Andrew Mitchell (born 1956), British politician
Arthur Mitchell (disambiguation), multiple people
Austin Mitchell (1934–2021), British politician
Barbara Mitchell (1929–1977), British actress
Belle Mitchell (1889–1979), American actress 
Beth Mitchell (1972–1998), American competitive shag dancer
Betty Mitchell (disambiguation), multiple people
Beverley Mitchell (born 1981), American actress
Billy Mitchell (disambiguation), multiple people
Bo Levi Mitchell (born 1990), American player of Canadian football
Bobby Mitchell (1935–2020), American football player
Brian David Mitchell, Kidnapper of Elizabeth Smart
Bruce Mitchell (disambiguation), multiple people
Bryant Mitchell (born 1992), American football player
Cal Mitchell (born 1999), American baseball player
Casey Mitchell (basketball) (born 1988), American basketball player
Charlene Mitchell (1930-2022), American civil rights activist
Charles Mitchell (disambiguation), multiple people
Charlotte Mitchell, British actress
Christopher Mitchell (disambiguation), multiple people
Chuck Mitchell (1927–1992), American actor
Cleta Mitchell (born 1950), American lawyer, politician and activist
Colin Mitchell (cricketer) (1929–2007), English cricketer
Colin Campbell Mitchell (1925–1996), British soldier and politician
Collin Mitchell (born 1969), Canadian curler
Coulson Norman Mitchell, Canadian recipient of the Victoria Cross
Dale Mitchell (disambiguation), multiple people
DaMarcus Mitchell (born 1998), American football player
Daniel Mitchell (disambiguation), multiple people
Danyel Mitchell (born 1972), American discus thrower and shot putter
David Mitchell (disambiguation), multiple people
Demetri Mitchell (born 1997), English footballer
Denis Mitchell (disambiguation), multiple people
Dennis Mitchell (born 1966), American athlete
Sir Dennis Mitchell (pilot) (1918–2001), British air force pilot
 Dervilla Mitchell, Irish engineer
Diana Mitchell (1932–2016), Zimbabwean historian and political activist
Dickon Mitchell (born 1978), Grenadian Politician
Dillon Mitchell (born 1998), American football player
Donovan Mitchell (born 1996) American Basketball Player
Drew Mitchell (born 1984), Australian rugby player
E. A. Mitchell (1910–1979), American politician
E. Belle Mitchell (1848–1942), American educator and activist
E. Coppée Mitchell (1836–1887), American professor
E. Roger Mitchell, (born 1971), American actor
Eddy Mitchell (born 1942), French singer and actor born Claude Moine
Edgar Mitchell (1930–2016), American astronaut
Edith Mitchell (born 1948), American Brigadier general and oncologist
Edward Mitchell, multiple people
Elijah Mitchell (born 1998), American football player
Elisha Mitchell (1793–1857), American professor
Elizabeth Mitchell (disambiguation), multiple people
Eugene Mitchell (1866-1944), American lawyer and politician
Ewan Mitchell (born 1997), English actor
Ewing Mitchell (1910–1988), American actor

F–L
Frederick Mitchell (disambiguation), multiple people
Fondren Mitchell (1921–1952), American football player
Garrett Mitchell (disambiguation), multiple people
Gary Mitchell (disambiguation), multiple people
Gay Mitchell Irish politician and member of the European Parliament for the Dublin constituency
Geneva Mitchell (1908–1949), American actress 
George Mitchell (disambiguation), multiple people
Glenn Mitchell (disambiguation), multiple people
Guy Mitchell (1927–1999), American singer and actor
Hannah Mitchell (1872–1956), English suffragette and socialist
Harold C. Mitchell (1872–1938), American lawyer and politician
H. Lane Mitchell, American politician
Henry Mitchell (disambiguation), multiple people
Howard Hawks Mitchell mathematician
Ian Mitchell (disambiguation), multiple people
Isaac Mitchell (writer) (1759–1812), New York newspaper publisher and author
Isaac B. Mitchell (1888–1977), New York state senator
Jacqui Mitchell (born 1936), American bridge player
James Mitchell (disambiguation), multiple people
Jamie Mitchell (born 1985), professional boxer
Jane E. Mitchell (1921–2004), African American nurse
Jemma Mitchell (born 1984), British–Australian convicted murderer
Joan Mitchell (1925-1992), American painter
John Mitchell (disambiguation), multiple people
Joni Mitchell (born 1943), Canadian musician and painter
Joseph Mitchell (disambiguation), multiple people
Julian Mitchell (born 1935), English screenwriter and occasional novelist
Juliet Mitchell (born 1940), British psychoanalyst
Katie Mitchell (born 1964), English theatre director
Keith Mitchell (disambiguation), multiple people
Kel Mitchell (born 1978), American actor
Kelsey Mitchell (born 1995), American basketball player
Kevin Mitchell (disambiguation), multiple people
Kim Mitchell (born 1952), Canadian guitarist, solo recording artist and former lead singer for the band Max Webster
Lauren Mitchell (born 1992), Australian gymnast, two time Olympic gymnast
Laurie Mitchell (1928–2018), American actress
Leilani Mitchell (born 1985), American basketball player
Leona Mitchell (born 1949), American operatic soprano
Leslie George Mitchell, British historian
Leslie R. Mitchell (1923–2014), British Scouter and radio amateur
Letila Mitchell, Rotuman performing artist from Fiji
Loften Mitchell (1919–2001), American playwright
Lucy Miller Mitchell (1899–2002), educator and activist
Lynette Mitchell, Professor in Greek History and Politics, University of Exeter

M–R
MacNeil Mitchell (1904–1996), New York politician
Maia Mitchell (born 1993), Australian actress
Mairin Mitchell (1895–1986), Anglo-Irish author 
Margaret Mitchell (1900–1949), American author (Gone with the Wind)
Margaret Mitchell (disambiguation), multiple people
Margaretta Mitchell (born 1935), American photographer and writer 
Maria Mitchell (1818–1889), American astronomer
Marion Mitchell (disambiguation), multiple people 
Mark Mitchell (disambiguation), multiple people
Martha Mitchell (director), American television director
Martha Beall Mitchell, wife of American politician John Mitchell
Martha Reed Mitchell (1818-1902), American philanthropist and socialite
Mason Mitchell (born 1994) American stock car racing driver
Matthew Mitchell (basketball) (born 1970), American basketball coach
Max Mitchell (born 1999), American football player
Maybelle Stephens Mitchell (1872–1919), American suffragist
Michele Mitchell (diver) (born 1962), American diver
Michele Mitchell (journalist), American filmmaker, journalist and author
Mike Mitchell (disambiguation), multiple people
Mitch Mitchell (1946–2008), drummer of the Jimi Hendrix Experience
Myron Mitchell (born 1998), American football player
Nathan Mitchell (born 1988), Canadian actor
Noble L. Mitchell (1854–1932), American politician
Norman Mitchell (1918–2001), British actor
Norman Mitchell (rugby league), rugby league footballer of the 1950s
Oliver Mitchell, U.S marine killed in action during World War II
Ormsby M. Mitchel (1810–1862), American Civil War general
Osirus Mitchell (born 1998), American football player
Patrick Mitchell (football), British Virgin Islands football manager
Patrick Mitchell (priest) (1930–2020), English Anglican priest
Penelope Mitchell, Australian actress
Peter Mitchell (disambiguation), multiple people
Priscilla Mitchell (1941–2014), American country music singer
R. Clayton Mitchell Jr. (1936–2019), American politician
Radha Mitchell, Australian film actress
R. J. Mitchell (Reginald Joseph Mitchell, 1895–1937), British aeronautical engineer and designer of the Supermarine Spitfire
Rhea Mitchell, American film actress
Richard Mitchell (disambiguation), multiple people
Robert Byington Mitchell, American Civil War general
Robin E. Mitchell (born 1946), Fijian sports official and IOC member
Rosamond Joscelyne Mitchell (1902–1963), English author, historian, and archivist
Rosemary Mitchell (1967-2021), English academic Victorianist

S–Z
Sam Mitchell (disambiguation), multiple people
Samuel Mitchell (disambiguation), multiple people
Saundra Mitchell (born 1973), American novelist
Scott Mitchell (disambiguation), multiple people
Seanna Mitchell (born 1988), Canadian freestyle swimmer
Shannon Mitchell (born 1972), American football player
Sharon Mitchell (born 1956), porn actress and director of the Adult Industry Medical Health Care Foundation
Shay Mitchell (born 1987), Canadian actress and model
Silas Weir Mitchell (actor) (born 1969), American actor
Silas Weir Mitchell (physician) (1829–1914), American surgeon
Stacey Mitchell (1990–2006), British girl murdered in Australia by lesbian couple Jessica Stasinowsky and Valerie Parashumti 
Stanley Mitchell (1932–2011), British translator, academic, and author
Stanley Robert Mitchell (1881–1963), Australian metallurgist and ethnologist
Steven Mitchell (American football) (born 1994), American football player
Stuart Mitchell (1965–2018), Scottish pianist and composer
Stuart Mitchell (American football) (born 1964), American football player
Sydney Mitchell (1856–1930), Scottish architect
Sydney B. Mitchell (1878–1951), Canadian librarian and horticulturist
Taylor Mitchell (1990–2009), Canadian singer
Terence Frederick Mitchell (1919–2007), British linguist
Thomas Mitchell (disambiguation), multiple people
Tyrone Mitchell (1955–1984), American school shooter
Victor Mitchell (born 1965), American businessman and politician
W. O. Mitchell (William Ormond Mitchell, 1914–1998), Canadian writer
Warren Mitchell (1926–2015), English actor
Warren Mitchell (basketball), American college basketball coach
 Wendy Mitchell (1932–1999), British nurse, midwife, politician and public servant
Wesley Clair Mitchell (1874–1948), American economist
William Mitchell (disambiguation), multiple people
Willy Mitchell (born 1953), Canadian First Nations musician
Zack Mitchell (born 1993), Canadian ice hockey player

Fictional characters
Arthur Mitchell (character) a.k.a. Trinity Killer, a serial killer in the fourth season of the TV series Dexter
Beca Mitchell in Pitch Perfect
Ben Mitchell (film character), from the Australian horror film Wolf Creek
President Bill Mitchell in the film Dave
Cameron Mitchell (Stargate) of Stargate SG-1
Dana Mitchell, the Pink Ranger in Power Rangers Lightspeed Rescue
Dennis the Menace (U.S.), cartoon character
Gary Mitchell (Star Trek), villain in the original Star Trek series
Hank and Jacob Mitchell, brothers from the novel and film "A Simple Plan"
Harold Mitchell, Blanche's would-be suitor in the play A Streetcar Named Desire and its various adaptations
Jack Mitchell (character), appears in numerous sketch stories by Henry Lawson
Jack Mitchell, protagonist in Call of Duty: Advanced Warfare
John Mitchell (Being Human), fictional vampire from the TV series Being Human
Lt. Pete Mitchell ("Maverick"), Top Gun and Top Gun: Maverick
Ryan Mitchell (Power Rangers), the Titanium Ranger in Power Rangers Lightspeed Rescue
Capt. Scott Mitchell, the protagonist and player character in Tom Clancy's Ghost Recon series

EastEnders
The Mitchell family has played a large part in the British soap opera EastEnders since their introduction in 1990. Characters credited under the surname are as follows:

 Amy Mitchell
 Archie Mitchell
 Ben Mitchell (EastEnders)
 Billy Mitchell
 Carla Mitchell
 Clive Mitchell (EastEnders)
 Courtney Mitchell
 Danny Mitchell (EastEnders)
 Freddie Mitchell (EastEnders)
 Glenda Mitchell
 Grant Mitchell (EastEnders)
 Honey Mitchell
 Jamie Mitchell
 Janet Mitchell (EastEnders)
 Jay Mitchell
 Kate Mitchell
 Kathy Mitchell
 Little Mo Mitchell
 Louise Mitchell
 Madge Mitchell
 Matthew Mitchell Cotton
 Nadia Mitchell
 Peggy Mitchell
 Phil Mitchell
 Ricky Mitchell
 Ronnie Mitchell
 Roxy Mitchell
 Sam Mitchell (EastEnders)
 Sharon Mitchell
 Ted Mitchell (EastEnders)
 Tiffany Mitchell
 William Mitchell (EastEnders)
 Vi Mitchell

See also 
Ó Maoilmhichil, Irish clan name which evolved into the surname Mitchell and the surname Mulvihill
Michell, a variant
Mittell, another surname
Mitchell (given name)

References 

Anglicised Irish-language surnames
English-language surnames
Patronymic surnames
Surnames of English origin

es:Mitchell
fr:Mitchell
ko:미첼
nl:Mitchell
ja:ミッチェル
pl:Mitchell
ru:Митчелл
sk:Mitchell
fi:Mitchell
vo:Mitchell